Kaghau Airport is an airport on Kaghau Island in the Solomon Islands . Sometimes it can be called Kagau Airport, or Kagau Island Airport.

Airlines and destinations

External links
Solomon Airlines Routes

Airports in the Solomon Islands